Cheiracanthium margaritae is a spider species found in Romania.

See also 
 List of Eutichuridae species

References

External links 

margaritae
Spiders of Europe
Spiders described in 1985